Daniel Ernst Bille (7 April 171125 February 1790) was a naval officer and rear admiral in the service of the Danish crown.

Personal
Daniel Ernst Bille was born on 7 April 1711, the son of captain Just Bille and Catherine Maule.  He was a nephew of admiral Michel Bille. On 8 July 1738 he was married in the naval church in Copenhagen to Johanne Sophie Amalie Stibolt (of the Christiansø Stibolt family)
His entire adult life was a period of relative peace for Denmark

Career
As a naval cadet Daniel Bille was given permission to sail with the Danish Asiatic Company ship Cronprintzen to Tranquebar on the Coromandel Coast, a voyage that lasted two years and during which he was commissioned as a junior lieutenant.   In 1735 he sailed again with the Asiatic company, this time to China returning in 1738.
As a senior lieutenant (from early 1740) he held the post of recruitment officer for Assens District on the island of Funen. In 1746 he sailed with the ship-of-the-line Delmenhorst to Algeria , being promoted further on his return in October that year.
In 1755.seeking a station close to his large family in Nyborg, he was granted this as captain of the snow Æro which was the guard ship for the Great Belt, and the following year as captain of the frigate Christiansø off Copenhagen.
Bille captained the frigate Bornholm in the fleet during 1758 before moving to the ship-of-the-line Delmenhorst in 1759 and 1760.,  employed in convoy duties to Lisbon and Marseille which included the delivery of hunting falcons to the king of Portugal. 
In 1761 he was an official observer on the sea trials of the new frigate Falster (designed and built by his son-in-law F M Krabbe) and in the following years acted as assessor in various courts martial. In March 1766 he refused to consider repaying a debt which his long dead father, Just Bille, had incurred to the Bornholm Infantry Regiment.

He commanded, in 1769, the ship-of-the-line Norske Løve, the best sailing ship in Admiral le Sage de Fontenay’s squadron.

Newly promoted to commodore, he spent most of 1769 in charge of the refitting and commissioning of some ships that were laid up in Norway.
With Rear Admiral rank from 1784 he held responsibility for the naval defence of Copenhagen

Death
Daniel Bille died on 25 February 1790 in Copenhagen and is buried in the naval cemetery of Holmen

Notes

References

Citations
Project Runeberg: C With on Daniel Ernst Bille  in Dansk Biografisk Lexikon Vol 2 page 223
T. A. Topsøe-Jensen og Emil Marquard (1935) “Officerer i den dansk-norske Søetat 1660–1814 og den danske Søetat 1814–1932" (Danish Naval Officers). Two volumes Volume 1 and Volume 2.
Royal Danish Naval Museum - "The Long Period of Peace"
Royal Danish Naval Museum - List of Danish Ships 

1711 births
1790 deaths
18th-century Danish naval officers
Royal Danish Navy admirals
Danish admirals
Bille family